Mordellistena lacensis is a beetle in the genus Mordellistena of the family Mordellidae. It was described in 1923 by Maurice Pic.

References

lacensis
Beetles described in 1923